Moycullen Basketball Club is an Irish basketball club based in Moycullen, County Galway. The club was founded in 1966.

The club's senior men's representative team plays in the Irish Super League. The team first played in the Super League, Ireland's top basketball league, in 2009. In 2014, they dropped down to the second-tiered National League Division 1 and won the Division 1 title. They subsequently returned to the Super League for the 2015–16 season.

References

External links
Official website

1966 establishments in Ireland
Basketball teams established in 1966
Basketball Club
Sports clubs in County Galway
Super League (Ireland) teams